Eastview and East View may refer to:

Place names

United States
Eastview, Kentucky
Eastview, Missouri
Eastview, New York
Eastview, Tennessee
East View, West Virginia
Eastview High School in Apple Valley, Minnesota

Canada
Eastview, Frontenac County, Ontario
Eastview, the former name of Vanier, Ontario
Eastview, Saskatoon, a neighbourhood in Saskatoon, Saskatchewan

Other
East View Geospatial, a mapping company
Eastview High School
Eastview Mall, a shopping centre in New York state
East View Stakes
HMCS Eastview (K665), a ship of the Canadian Navy